

Secondary schools

High schools
 Acadiana High School
 Carencro High School
 Ovey Comeaux High School
 Lafayette High School
 Northside High School
 Southside High School
 Early College Academy

Private schools
 Ascension Episcopal School
 Episcopal School of Acadiana
 John Paul The Great Academy
 St. Thomas More School
 Teurlings Catholic High School
 Westminster Christian Academy

References

External links
 http://www.diolaf.org/

 
Schools in Lafayette Parish, Louisiana
Lafayette